Ian James Paton (born 1957) is a British Anglican bishop. Since 2018, he has been the Bishop of St Andrews, Dunkeld and Dunblane in the Scottish Episcopal Church.

Biography 
He was Rector of Old Saint Paul's, Edinburgh from 1997 to 2018, and a Canon of St Mary's Cathedral, Edinburgh from 2004 to 2018. In June 2018, it was announced that he had been elected as the next Bishop of St Andrews, Dunkeld and Dunblane. He was consecrated and installed as bishop during a service at St Ninian's Cathedral, Perth on 20 October 2018.

References

1957 births
Living people
21st-century Scottish Episcopalian bishops
21st-century Anglican priests
Bishops of Saint Andrews, Dunkeld and Dunblane